ZFK Fruškogorac (Serbian Cyrillic: ЖФК Фpушкoгopaц) is a women's football club based in Novi Sad, Serbia. They currently play in the northern section of the second division in Serbia, the Druga Liga Srbije Sever.

Current squad 

Isidora Sekulic
Arijana Đurić
Tanja Miladinov
Julijana Tatic
Tamara Popovic
Jelena Gvozdenac
Aleksandra Draganović
Jovana Orlandić
Aleksandra Marinković
Dajana Đurić
Miroslava Radosavljev
Amanda Madači
Rada Tomašević
Olivera Milošević
Tanja Blagojević
Ljubica Rušiti
Milana Golubović
Milica Nenadov
Tamara Papić
Jelena Rajčetić
Zorana Martinović
Aleksandra Prnjavorac
Tijana Pejović

External links
Official Website

Women's football clubs in Serbia
Football clubs in Novi Sad
1998 establishments in Serbia